Chilodus is a genus of chilodontid headstanders from South America, found in the Orinoco and Amazon Basins, as well as various rivers in the Guianas.  The currently described species in this genus are:
 Chilodus fritillus Vari & H. Ortega, 1997
 Chilodus gracilis Isbrücker & Nijssen, 1988
 Chilodus punctatus J. P. Müller & Troschel, 1844 (spotted headstander )
 Chilodus zunevei Puyo, 1946

References

 

Chilodontidae (fish)
Taxa named by Johannes Peter Müller
Taxa named by Franz Hermann Troschel
Fish of South America